The River Clady is a mid-scale river in County Londonderry, Northern Ireland, a tributary of the Lower Bann.  It forms from the confluence of the Grillagh River and Knockoneil River.

Course
The river flows through the flatlands outside Culnady for some miles and this area often floods during peak flows. The first bridge to span the river is Eden Bridge, also known as Drumnacannon Bridge. The river was originally 2 to 3 times its current width, until around the mid 20th century, when the river underwent a major dredging operation, including up the Clady and Knockoneil, to control the mass amount of floodwater not only from the hills of Slaughtneil but also William Clark & Sons of Upperlands, coming from the sluice gates and flood gates. This work damaged the river as it was left like a canal, only half its original width and twice its original depth, with parts over 10 feet deep.  The river continues in similar form until it reaches Clady, where it widens even more up to 30 to 40 feet wide. It flows by Innishrush and down a rocky gorge like terrain behind Clady, under the Old Clady Bridge, and then settles as it approaches the Glenone Bridge, where the water is 40 foot+ until it meets the River Bann.  

The river is of medium scale, and it is measured at Glenone Bridge, an old bridge under which the river flows before it empties into the Lower Bann. During a flood, it can turn from a quiet trickle to a torrent within a few hours of heavy rain; this led to the drowning of Robert Reid and Agnes Henry in the 1920s when they went over the Clady bridge.

Bridges 
There are three major bridges over the Clady: Eden Bridge, Clady Bridge, Glenone Bridge, in that order.

Tributary rivers and streams

Artery rivers
The Knockoneil River is the larger artery river feeding the main Clady River. It is often referred to as the Clady.  The river starts up on Carntogher and flows down through Swatragh, then Upperlands, and finally Culandy - before merging with the Grillagh to form the Clady River shortly downstream from Dunglady Bridge. The river provides for angling, and boasts a lot of healthy Brown Trout and salmon, especially late season.

The Grillagh River is the second artery to the Clady River. This smaller watercourse rivals the size of the upper River Clady, being around 10 feet to 20 feet wide. The river starts up in Slaughtneil at the confluence of the Altkeeran Pollan, Carn and Olivia Burns. These burns are all arteries of the main Grillagh River. It flows down into and through Culnady before emptying into the Clady below Curdian Bridge. It has some angling, including brown trout and salmon.

Tributaries
Lavey River: This starts in Lavey near Gulladuff and flows north and swings to the east through the lowlands through Eden south of McGoldrick Transport premises, and into the Clady not far from Clady village. This burn may hold stocks of small fish or even trout spawning beds on its final run.

Angling
There is a fishing club house located along its banks just outside Clady. The facility consists of a fish counter and a weir constructed in 2011 for salmon spawning. Multiple fishing piers are located along the embankment. The best time to catch a fish is in the months of September and October before the fishing season ends on 31 October.

The river's angling rights is leased by the Clady And District Angling Club funded in 1962.

References 

Rivers of County Londonderry